The Australian Journal of Zoology is a bimonthly peer-reviewed scientific journal published by CSIRO Publishing. It covers research on all aspects of zoology, with a special focus on the fauna of Australia. The editor-in-chief is Paul Cooper (Australian National University).

Abstracting and indexing
The journal is abstracted and indexed in AGRICOLA, Elsevier Biobase, Biological Abstracts, BIOSIS Previews, CAB Abstracts, Chemical Abstracts Service, Current Contents/Agriculture, Biology & Environmental Sciences, Science Citation Index Expanded, Scopus, and The Zoological Record. According to the Journal Citation Reports, the journal has a 2021 impact factor of 1.073.

See also
List of zoology journals

References

External links

Zoology journals
Science and technology in Australia
Publications established in 1953
CSIRO Publishing academic journals
English-language journals
Bimonthly journals